Wigan Springs Branch TMD is a traction maintenance depot located in Ince in Makerfield, near Wigan, Greater Manchester, England. There has been a Motive power depot (engine shed or locomotive depot) in the area of the current depot since the 1840s.

Current usage, since 2018
The depot was rebuilt between 2018 and 2020, re-opening on 7 February 2020 as a facility able to stable and service 24 electric and eight diesel trains operated by Northern Trains.

History

Before 1870
The first locomotive shed in this area was opened by the London and North Western Railway (L&NWR) around 1847, shortly after the line, which was originally the North Union Railway, was leased jointly by the London and North Western Railway and the Manchester and Leeds Railway (M&LR). 

There was a coaling stage next to the shed and a turntable located in the 'V' of junction between the main line into Wigan and the Springs branch. The shed had a capacity of 6 locomotives. In 1864, a temporary, timber built 1 track straight shed was added a little south of the first shed.

1869 to 1882
In 1869, after representations by the Chief Mechanical Engineer, John Ramsbottom, a new brick built 8 track straight dead-ended shed with a twin parallel hipped slate roof was constructed. Its facilities included a coal stage and a  water tank located to the front left of the main building. The original shed remained open for a short while after the new shed opened. When the new shed opened the turntable remained in the 'V' of junction.

1882 to 1935
By 1881 the shed was accommodating 86 locomotives and the Chief Mechanical Engineer, by this time Francis Webb, gained authority for a second building. In 1882	the shed was extended by the addition of a brick built 8 track straight dead-ended shed with a northlight pattern roof along the eastern wall. The new shed became known as "No 2" with the former shed referred to as "No 1". A  turntable was installed behind the coaling stage in front of the shed. 

Around this time the L&NWR started to use codes for its sheds and Springs Branch was allocated 25.

In 1930s both buildings had their roof vents replaced.

1935 to 1966
In 1935 considerable changes were made to the trackwork in front of the sheds as the site was expanded on its eastern side, the old coaling stage, water tank and turntable were removed and replaced by a mechanical coaling plant, two coal storage sidings, a new ash plant and a larger  water tank. A new  Gresham & Craven electrically operated turntable was installed alongside No 2 shed.

In 1935 the shed was given the code 10A by the London, Midland and Scottish Railway (LMS).

In 1951 the "No 1" shed was rebuilt as a 6 track shed of the same dimensions, the new design allowing for extra space between the roads. It had a louvre style roof vents and a brick screen installed between the main shed and the workshops at the rear which had been kept from the old shed. The shed was fitted an electric wheel drop, overhead gantry cranes and illuminated inspection pits. 

In 1955	the "No 2" shed was re-roofed with a steel frame covered in corrugated iron sheeting. 

From March 1958 British Railways allocated the code 8F. 

In the winter of 1960/61 "No 2" shed was mostly demolished to make way for a 4 road diesel depot built with a steel frame, corrugated roof and sides, which opened in 1967. The remaining four outside roads were used for stabling and provided with stanchion lighting.

1966 to 2005 
The four road diesel shed did not last long, it was demolished in 1966, together with the turntable. A new three road diesel maintenance depot was constructed on the site, opening in April 1968, additional buildings for offices and stores were built to the rear of the new shed, with the older offices at the rear of "No 1" shed being used for train crew. Meanwhile, steam locomotives stopped being allocated to the shed on 4 December 1967. 

"No 1" shed continued in use for stabling and later as a store until its demolition in October 1983, after the demolition the tracks were used for locomotive and wagon storage.

With the introduction of TOPS depot codes in May 1973 the depot became SP. 

The shed officially closed on 4 May 1997 but as part of the privatisation of British Rail it was quickly taken over by English, Welsh & Scottish Railway (EWS) as a component recovery depot, it continued in this role until 2005.

2005 to 2018
The depot was under lease to DB Schenker Rail UK (as EWS had become) and was used for breakdown crane stabling and seasonal fleet (MPVs) maintenance and stabling.

Allocations
Locomotives were frequently moved around the railways so any list of allocations is necessarily a snapshot.

London and North Western Railway
L&NWR locomotive policy was to replace locomotives going for overhaul with a similar locomotive that had just been overhauled making individual locomotive allocations difficult to track.

In November 1911 the shed had an allocation of 95 locomotives by 1913 this had increased to 102 locomotives but by October 1917 the allocation had reduced to 76.

London, Midland and Scottish Railway
Coates (2010) provides a comprehensive list of which types of locomotives were allocated to the shed for most years of LMS ownership, the summaries for 1928, 1938 and 1948 are shown here.

British Railways
The British Rail period saw some major changes that affected the shed allocations, in March 1952 the shed at Lower Ince closed and the ex-Great Central locomotives allocated there moved to Springs shed. In April 1964 the former L&YR shed at Wigan closed and its locomotives were then allocated to Springs. The shed finally closed to steam locomotives  on 4 December 1967, prior to this a lot of locomotives were withdrawn and stored, being replaced by diesel traction.

Coates (2010) provides a comprehensive list of which types of locomotives were allocated to the shed for most years during the British Railways steam era, the summaries for 1950, 1959 and 1965 are shown here as Bolger (1981), and the online BR Database also provides lists of steam locomotives types for these years, the differences in the totals can be accounted for by the day-to-day fluctuations of allocations.

During the diesel era the shed had the following allocations;

References

Notes

Citations

Bibliography

 

 

Railway depots in England
Rail transport in Lancashire